Buenache de la Sierra is a municipality in  the province of Cuenca, Castile-La Mancha, Spain. , it has a population of 111.

References

External links

Municipalities in the Province of Cuenca